Ningaloo Marine Park may mean:

 Ningaloo Marine Park (Commonwealth waters), the marine park in Commonwealth waters managed by Parks Australia of the Australian Government.
 Ningaloo Marine Park (state waters), the marine park in state waters managed by the Department of Parks and Wildlife of Western Australia.